Hyllus semicupreus, the heavy-bodied jumper, also known as the semi-coppered heavy jumper, is a species of spider of the genus Hyllus. It is native to India, Pakistan and Sri Lanka.

Description
As usual in spider morphology, the female is much larger than male, where the female is about 8-9 mm in total length and the male is 7-9 mm in length.

Ecology
Heavy-bodied jumper spiders can be seen commonly among foliage and within tree trunks. They construct oval, thick silken webs on the undersides of leaves, such as the leaf spikes of coconut trees. During the daytime, the sac is uninhabited, but at night, the male occupies the sac. Sometimes, though,  the female also inhabits it.

Diet
The spider is known to eat small insects such as grasshoppers, flies, and bees, and other small spiders.

Gallery

References

External links
Hyllus semicupreus (♂,♀) (SIMON, 1885) drawings and photos
Salticidae: Diagnostic Drawings Library

Spiders described in 1885
Salticidae
Arthropods of India
Invertebrates of Sri Lanka
Spiders of Asia